Godøy Chapel is a chapel of the Church of Norway in Sunndal Municipality in Møre og Romsdal county, Norway. It is located on the small island of Godøy. It is an annex chapel in the Giske parish which is part of the Nordre Sunnmøre prosti (deanery) in the Diocese of Møre. The stone chapel was built in 1953 using plans drawn up by the architect O.S. Solheim. The chapel seats about 200 people.

History
In 1902, a small prayer house was built on the island of Godøy. In 1953, the old building was torn down and a new prayer house was constructed. In 1979, the building was expanded using plans by Olav Solheim. After the addition, the prayer house was upgraded to the status of annex chapel for the parish. In both 2001 and again in 2008 the chapel was enlarged. The chapel is owned by a foundation and it is rented by the parish council for church activities. It is also used for other purposes.

See also
List of churches in Møre

References

Giske
Churches in Møre og Romsdal
Stone churches in Norway
Long churches in Norway
20th-century Church of Norway church buildings
Churches completed in 1953
1902 establishments in Norway